Galactik Fiestamatik is the second studio album of Filipino singer, Rico Blanco. It was released on 2012, and was also his last release with Warner Music Philippines.

Track listing

Bonus tracks

References

External links
https://itunes.apple.com/us/album/galactik-fiestamatik-bonus/id541517935

2012 albums
Rico Blanco albums